In geometry, Boy's surface is an immersion of the real projective plane in 3-dimensional space found by Werner Boy in 1901. He discovered it on assignment from David Hilbert to prove that the projective plane could not be immersed in 3-space. 

Boy's surface was first parametrized explicitly by Bernard Morin in 1978. Another parametrization was discovered by Rob Kusner and Robert Bryant. Boy's surface is one of the two possible immersions of the real projective plane which have only a single triple point.

Unlike the Roman surface and the cross-cap, it has no other singularities than self-intersections (that is, it has no pinch-points).

Symmetry of the Boy's surface

Boy's surface has 3-fold symmetry.  This means that it has an axis of discrete rotational symmetry: any 120° turn about this axis will leave the surface looking exactly the same.  The Boy's surface can be cut into three mutually congruent pieces.

Model at Oberwolfach

The Mathematical Research Institute of Oberwolfach has a large model of a Boy's surface outside the entrance, constructed and donated by Mercedes-Benz in January 1991. This model has 3-fold rotational symmetry and minimizes the Willmore energy of the surface.  It consists of steel strips which represent the image of a polar coordinate grid under a parameterization given by Robert Bryant and Rob Kusner. The meridians (rays) become ordinary Möbius strips, i.e. twisted by 180 degrees. All but one of the strips corresponding to circles of latitude (radial circles around the origin) are untwisted, while the one corresponding to the boundary of the unit circle is a Möbius strip twisted by three times 180 degrees — as is the emblem of the institute .

Applications
Boy's surface can be used in sphere eversion, as a half-way model.  A half-way model is an immersion of the sphere with the property that a rotation interchanges inside and outside, and so can be employed to evert (turn inside-out) a sphere.  Boy's (the case p = 3) and Morin's (the case p = 2) surfaces begin a sequence of half-way models with higher symmetry first proposed by George Francis, indexed by the even integers 2p (for p odd, these immersions can be factored through a projective plane).  Kusner's parametrization yields all these.

Parametrization of Boy's surface

Boy's surface can be parametrized in several ways. One parametrization, discovered by Rob Kusner and Robert Bryant, is the following: given a complex number w whose magnitude is less than or equal to one, let

and then set 

we then obtain the Cartesian coordinates x, y, and z   of a point on the Boy's surface.

If one performs an inversion of this parametrization centered on the triple point, one obtains a complete minimal surface with three ends (that's how this parametrization was discovered naturally).  This implies that the Bryant–Kusner parametrization of Boy's surfaces is "optimal" in the sense that it is the "least bent" immersion of a projective plane into three-space.

Property of Bryant–Kusner parametrization

If w is replaced by the negative reciprocal of its complex conjugate,  then the functions g1, g2, and g3 of w are left unchanged.

This shows that Boy's surface is not only an algebraic surface, but even a rational surface. The remark of the preceding paragraph shows that the generic fiber of this parameterization consists of two points (that is that almost every point of Boy's surface may be obtained by two parameters values).

Relating the Boy's surface to the real projective plane
Let  be the Bryant–Kusner parametrization of Boy's surface. Then

This explains the condition  on the parameter: if  then  However, things are slightly more complicated for   In this case, one has  This means that, if  the point of the Boy's surface is obtained from two parameter values:  In other words, the Boy's surface has been parametrized by a disk such that pairs of diametrically opposite points on the perimeter of the disk are equivalent. This shows that the Boy's surface is the image of the real projective plane, RP2 by a smooth map. That is, the parametrization of the Boy's surface is an immersion of the real projective plane into the Euclidean space.

References

Citations

Sources 

  This describes a piecewise linear model of Boy's surface.
  Article on the cover illustration that accompanies the Rob Kirby article.
 .
 Sanderson, B. Boy's will be Boy's, (undated, 2006 or earlier).

External links 

Boy's surface at MathCurve; contains various visualizations, various equations, useful links and references
A planar unfolding of the Boy's surface – applet from Plus Magazine.
 Boy's surface resources, including the original article, and an embedding of a topologist in the Oberwolfach Boy's surface.
 A LEGO Boy's surface
 A paper model of Boy's surface – pattern and instructions
 Java-based model that can be freely rotated
 A model of Boy's surface in Constructive Solid Geometry together with assembling instructions
 Boy's surface visualization video from the Mathematical Institute of the Serbian Academy of the Arts and Sciences

Surfaces
Geometric topology